Allorbimorphus is a genus of Isopoda parasites, in the family Bopyridae, containing the following species that can be found on the coasts of Australia, and Asia:
Allorbimorphus australiensis Bourdon, 1976
Allorbimorphus haigae  Bourdon, 1976
Allorbimorphus scabriculi  Bourdon, 1976
Allorbimorphus tuberculus  An, Zhang & Li, 2012
Allorbimorphus lamellosus Nierstrasz & Brender à Brandis, 1923

References 

Cymothoida